Viengphoukha is a district (muang) of Luang Namtha province in northwestern Laos.

Settlements
Vieng Phouka (capital)

References

Districts of Luang Namtha province